DirectX Media is a set of multimedia-related APIs for Microsoft Windows complementing DirectX.

Retained Mode was used by a variety of applications and can still be implemented on systems newer than XP by copying the d3drm.dll file from an older version of Windows to the system32 directory (for 32 bit Windows) or SysWOW64 directory (for 64 bit Windows) to regain system-wide support.

External links
DirectAnimation (MSDN)
DirectX Transform (MSDN)

Microsoft application programming interfaces
Discontinued Microsoft software
Media DirectX Media
Internet Explorer